1,2-Diiodoethane is an organoiodine compound.

Preparation and reactions

1,2-Diiodoethane can be prepared by the reaction of ethylene with iodine (I):

CH + I  CHI 

1,2-Diiodoethane is most commonly used in organic synthesis in the preparation of samarium(II) iodide or ytterbium(II) iodide in an inert solvent such as THF.
Sm + ICH2CH2I → SmI2 + H2C=CH2

Spectral properties 
In mass spectroscopy, 1,2-diiodoethane exhibits 5 major peaks, with the base peak showing at 155 m/z, which is the loss of one iodine atom (127 m/z).

References

Iodoalkanes